The Eighth Seimas of Lithuania was a parliament (Seimas) elected in Lithuania. Elections took place on 8 October 2000. The Seimas commenced its work on 19 October 2000 and served a four-year term, with the last session on 11 November 2004.

Elections

In the elections in 2000, 70 members of the parliament were elected on proportional party lists and 71 in single member constituencies. Elections took place on 8 October 2000. No run-off was held in single seat constituencies and the candidate with the most votes was declared a winner.

Liberal Union became the largest party in the parliament after winning 34 seats, followed by 29 seats won by New Union (Social Liberals). The Social-Democratic Coalition of Algirdas Brazauskas won 51 seats, with the largest party in the coalition, Democratic Labour Party of Lithuania, winning 26.

 Two Modern Christian-Democratic Union candidates were elected in the proportional vote, having run on the lists of the New Union (Social Liberals) and the Liberal Union of Lithuania.

Activities

Artūras Paulauskas was elected as the Speaker of the Eighth Seimas. After the impeachment of Rolandas Paksas, Paulauskas acted as the President of Lithuania from 6 April 2004 until 12 July 2004. Česlovas Juršėnas acted as the Speaker of the Seimas during the time.

The Eighth Seimas saw an initial ruling coalition of Liberals and New Union (Social Liberals), which lasted less than a year. By July 2001, New Union (Social Liberals) joined the Social Democratic Coalition, headed by Algirdas Brazauskas. Under the term of the Seimas, Lithuania joined the European Union and NATO. It continued privatizations of energy enterprises (e. g. Lietuvos dujos and Lietuvos energija). Also this Seimas oversaw the impeachment of President of Republic Rolandas Paksas.

Composition

Parliamentary groups

During the first session of the Seimas the following parliamentary groups were registered: Social Democratic Coalition, Liberals, New Union (Social Liberals), Homeland Union - Conservatives, Peasant and New Democracy Parties and the Mixed Group of Members of the Seimas.

At the beginning of the session, a quota (7 members) for parliamentary group formation has been introduced. This change came after experience with previous Seimas, in which parliamentary group might have been as small as 2 members.

Substantial shifts between parliamentary groups occurred during the term. In 2001, numerous members of the Liberals parliamentary group either joined Independent parliamentary group (in 2002 it renamed itself to the Liberal Democratic parliamentary group) or Homeland Union - Conservatives parliamentary group. In 2003, this parliamentary group was joined by the several members from Mixed Group and formed Liberal and Center parliamentary group.

Similar process happened in New Union (Social Liberals) parliamentary group between 2002 and 2004, when numerous members moved to the Social Democratic Coalition or Liberal Democratic parliamentary group. By the end of the term of the Seimas, the following parliamentary groups were active.

Members
A total of 151 members served on the Eighth Seimas.

References

Legal history of Lithuania
2000 in Lithuania
08